The Bastard is the first album by the American progressive/heavy metal band Hammers of Misfortune, released in 2001.

Critical reception
AllMusic wrote: "Nothing less than a three-act heavy metal opera with role-playing vocals sung by the band members, the album draws on a whole range of metal influences—from Thin Lizzy and Iron Maiden to Mercyful Fate and Opeth—and ties them together with some Celtic folk touches to create a sound that, while it does feel a little '80s nostalgic, is actually pretty original." Loudwire thought that there's not "much of a musical precedent for the group’s fearless brand of blackened prog-metal, made all the more stunning and unique by distinct vocal styles for each character and even folk music ingredients." SF Weekly declared that "Hammers of Misfortune's well-orchestrated melodicism, kaleidoscopic riffs, quirky time signatures, and striking vocals are grandiose and metalriffic—and that's no myth."

Track listing

Personnel
Hammers of Misfortune
 John Cobbettelectric guitar, acoustic guitar, screams
 Chewy Marzolodrums
 Janis Tanakabass guitar, vocals
 Mike Scalzielectric guitar, vocals

Production
 Rich Morinengineer
 Justin Weis mixing and mastering at Trakworx, South San Francisco, California
 John Cobbettproducer
 Lorraine Rathillustrations, design, lettering
 Ross Sewage and Jeanie M.photography

Additional information
 The band did not record The Bastard in a typical recording studio. The liner notes state: "this album was recorded on an 8-track analog machine in a rehearsal space in San Francisco between July 1999 and February 2000."

References 

2001 albums
Hammers of Misfortune albums